Giuseppe Nuvolari (30 January 1871 – 25 November 1962) was an Italian professional racing cyclist. His brother Arturo, who also competed as a cyclist, was the father of the motor and car racing ace Tazio Nuvolari.

On the track his speciality was Motor-paced racing, in this discipline he won the Italian National Championship twice, in 1894 and 1904 and made the podium on three more occasions. In team races he frequently partnered with sprint ace Pietro Bixio.

References 

1871 births
1962 deaths
Italian male cyclists
Road racing cyclists
Italian track cyclists
Cyclists from the Province of Mantua
People from Castel d'Ario